CD-13 was a Type C escort ship (Kaibōkan) of the Imperial Japanese Navy during the Second World War.

History
CD-13 was laid down by Nippon Kokan K. K. at their Tsurumi Shipyard on 18 December 1943, launched on 9 February 1944, and completed and commissioned on 3 April 1944. She was assigned to the Kure Guard Force, Yokosuka Naval District under  Reserve Lieutenant Kondo Genichi. During the war CD-13 was mostly busy on escort duties.

On 26 June 1945, she was attached to the 4th escort unit, Maizuru Guard Force, Maizuru Naval District. At 1225, she received a single torpedo hit to the stern and at 1235, the order to abandon ship was given.

CD-13 was struck from the Navy List on 15 September 1945. She was the last Japanese ship sunk in action during World War II (ships would continue to be lost to mines).

References

Additional sources

1944 ships
Ships built in Japan
Type C escort ships
Maritime incidents in August 1945
World War II shipwrecks in the Sea of Japan
Ships sunk by American submarines